Ability with Innovation (AWI) is an international diversified services company headquartered in Baghdad, Iraq and Dubai, United Arab Emirates. AWI serves the energy, oil and gas and government markets of Iraq.

AWI was founded by Abdul Mahdi Muslim Tahir Al-Juboori, who is among the first construction pioneers of Iraq. An engineer by trade and education. Al-Juboori's independent construction portfolio includes several factories, banks, health centres, schools, ballet courts, library buildings and a broadcasting tower.

The founder's son, Abather Al-Juboori, is the current Chairman/Chief Strategy Officer.

Founder of AWI 

Abdul Mahdi Muslim Tahir Al-Juboori (Arabic: عبد المهدي مسلم طاهر الجبوري; July 1, 1943) is an Iraqi businessman and entrepreneur. In  27 July 1987 he founded Baghdad Company for Passengers and Good Transportation. Abdul Mahdi is one of the first major shareholders, and was appointed as the first Chairman and CEO of the company.

Early life and education 
Abdul Mahdi Muslim Tahir Al-Juboori was born in 1943 in Al-Shamasya Neighborhood in Baghdad. He is the oldest son of Hajj Muslim Al-Tahir, a well-known merchant in  Baghdad during the first half of the 20th century through his trade in construction materials. He belongs to Al-Juboori tribe. Abdul Mahdi's family has moved to Baghdad from Mosul 400 years ago. Abdul Mahdi graduated in 1960 from Al-Shamasya high school with Honors in Baghdad and received a Bachelor of Science in Civil Engineering From University of Technology in Baghdad in 1967. Abdul Mahdi was one of the first engineer who joins the Iraqi Engineers Union.

Career 
Immediately After graduation in 1967,  Abdul Mahdi start working for the Ministry of Industry  as a Resident Engineer at the Glass Factory in Ramadi and Abu Ghraib Ready Mix Concrete Plant.

Then joining the General Directorate for Industrial Engineering and Construction in 1969 as a  Project Manager for the Industrial Residential Complexes for the Leather National Company and Hillah Textile Factory.

In 1970 he founded his own general contracting business in Baghdad that is known today as Ability with Innovation (AWI).

In  27 July 1987 he founded Baghdad Company for Passengers and Good Transportation. Abdul Mahdi is one of the first major shareholder and was appointed as the first Chairman and CEO of the company.

Corporate history

Early history
 In 1970, Abdul Mahdi Muslim Al-Juboori started his private business In Baghdad, Iraq with a contracting license from the Iraqi Contracting Union. Throughout the '70s, large investments were made in infrastructure as revenue from oil poured in from the nationalization of the Iraqi Petroleum Company. The business flourished during this explosive development period, which focused on technology, education, building major infrastructure projects, and creating a solid industrial base.

From 1980–1988, the Iran–Iraq War altered the course of Iraqi history. During this period, the oil revenues were diverted to fuel the Iraqi Army, which strained the Iraq economy. Abdul Mahdi was forced to join the public army and the company activities were then focused on both investing in Iraq stock market and renting heavy equipment to the Ministry of Housing & Construction.

In 1985, the Iraqi Contracting Union required all contractors to be registered with the Ministry of Trade and operate under a company license issued by the company registrar. The “Abdul Mahdi Muslim Company” was established.

From 1991–2003, severe United Nations sanctions slowed the Iraqi economy and the company's construction activities were dramatically affected. However, during this time, the company continued to invest in the Iraq stock market and generated profit by collecting dividends from the substantial capital investments over the past 20 years.

Recent history
In July 2005, Abather Al-Juboori (son of the founder) was appointed as the new CEO of the company. To better serve the clients FIC Consultants Engineering was formed to pursue procurement opportunities supporting LOGCAP III. The company expanded its market to new customers including Fluor, Aim Group, and Spectrum Worldwide. Over the years, several companies emerged to support the requirements of the Government of Iraq, the U.S. Government and commercial entities. These separate companies included Gruppo Cadini SRL, Spectrum Worldwide (joint venture), Caesar Trading & Construction, LLC and FIC Consultants Engineering.

In September 2011, under the leadership and guidance of the CEO, Mr. Al-Juboori, all of the company subsidiaries were merged to form a single entity and the company name is changed to AWI, Ability with Innovation.

Organization
Currently, AWI is one of the largest providers of Host Country National Labor in Iraq with more than 20,000 Iraqis since its inception. AWI has offices in Erbil, Baghdad, and Basra, Iraq. Management positions include Chairman/Chief Strategy Officer, President, Vice President of Finance, Construction Services Manager, Director of Special Projects, Director of HSE & Compliance, Director of Contracts, Business Development Director and Procurement Director.

Services
AWI is a provider for commercial and government entities operating in Iraq. The company focuses on the services such as Corrosion Protection, Welding, Fabrication, Nondestructive Testing (NDT), Scaffolding material rental and erection, Painting, Equipment Leasing, Workforce Solutions, Procurement /Logistics, Electrical Contracting and General Construction Services.

See also 

 List of oilfield service companies

References

Engineering companies of Iraq
Oilfield services companies
Construction and civil engineering companies established in 1970
1970 establishments in Iraq
Business services companies established in 1970
Iraqi brands
Iraqi companies established in 1970